The Monthly Review (1749–1845) was an English periodical founded by Ralph Griffiths, a Nonconformist bookseller. The first periodical in England to offer reviews, it featured the novelist and poet Oliver Goldsmith as an early contributor. Griffiths himself, and likely his wife Isabella Griffiths, contributed review articles to the periodical. Later contributors included Dr. Charles Burney, John Cleland, Theophilus Cibber, James Grainger, Anna Letitia Barbauld, Elizabeth Moody, and Tobias Smollett—who would go on to establish the Monthly's competitor in 1756, The Critical Review. William Kenrick, the "superlative scoundrel", was editor from 1759 to 1766.

Publishing history of the Monthly Review 
Volumes 1–81, May 1749–Dec. 1789;
{2d ser.} v. 1–108, Jan. 1790–Nov. 1825;
new {3d} ser., v. 1–15, Jan. 1826–Dec. 1830;
new {4th} ser., v. 1–45, Jan. 1831–Dec. 1844.  (The 4-month volumes in this series are numbered I, II, and III on the title page, restarting at I each January, but some libraries and indexes number the volumes continuously from 1831.)

Many libraries have incorrectly cataloged the periodical as the London Monthly Review.

Format 
Each issue of the Monthly was divided into two sections: longer reviews of several pages were in the front section, short reviews of lesser works were featured in the back Monthly Catalogue, divided by genre headings.

See also 
 List of nineteenth-century British periodicals
 List of eighteenth-century British periodicals
 List of eighteenth century journals

References

External links 
 Online scans of nearly all Monthly Review volumes

1749 establishments in Great Britain
Defunct literary magazines published in the United Kingdom
History of Great Britain
Magazines published in London
Magazines established in 1749
Magazines disestablished in 1845